(1277–1360) was a Japanese Rinzai Zen Buddhist monk, founder of Myōshin-ji Temple and a principal member of the extant Ōtōkan lineage, from which all modern Rinzai Zen derives.  Centuries later, Emperor Meiji conferred the posthumous name  to Kanzan.

Biography 
Kanzan Egen was born in Shinano Province on January 7, 1277.  He initially studied Rinzai Zen Buddhism under Nanpo Jōmyō, who received dharma-transmission from China and later under Nanpo Jōmyō's student, Shūhō Myōchō.  After Shūhō Myōchō confirmed Kanzan Egen's enlightenment, Kanzan went to Mino Province and dwelt in the Ibuki Mountains for intensive training.

During this time, Emperor Hanazono recalled Kanzan to the capitol to help found a new temple which became Myōshin-ji Temple.

References 

1277 births
1360 deaths
Japanese Buddhist clergy
Rinzai Buddhists
Kamakura period Buddhist clergy